Government Islamia Science College is located in Karachi, Pakistan. It is one of the largest colleges in Pakistan. The college provides faculties of Science, Law, Commerce and Arts. It is located just opposite Dawood College of Engineering and Technology. Islamia Science College, Islamia Law College, Islamia Commerce and Arts College are in one complex which was founded by  Abdul Rehman Muhammad Qureshi. The college was inaugurated by President Ayub Khan in August 1961.

History
Abdul Rehman Muhammad Qureshi was the founder of seventeen schools and colleges which were operational under his own personal administration. He introduced in Karachi the Qureshi Night College. He died on 22 June 1989.

The college has faced many disputes and media attention for political riots and killings. Many students of the Islami Jamiat Talba group have been indulged in fights with PSF and APMSO groups, during the 1970s the college was a centre of gun firing, public shootouts and political nuisances which gave the college a bad reputation.

In 2004, the college faced building issues in which the official assignee karachi, Kadir Bukhsh Umrani filed a rent case before the Rent Controller East Karachi for recovery of rent of the building and vacation of the premises. The Student organization protested against the issue, the students filled local government buses on route no 11C and protested for 30 minutes outside the Karachi Press Club. A student protest outside the Islamia College took an ugly turn on 29 October 2008 after a clash erupted between [Islami Jamiat-e-Talaba] students and the area police. A female journalist was injured and six students were arrested in the incident, Taha Riaz, IJT head of Islamia College, Nauman Hameed, Makhdoom Hussain, Abdul Wahab, Niaz Ahmed, and Sonu Khan under sections 147 and 148. The students had been given half a road to protest on, but they took over the entire road. When they were asked to clear the way for traffic, especially for ambulances and fire brigades, they instead started pelting stones.

Notable alumni
 Altaf Hussain, of the Muttahida Qaumi Movement
 Zaheer Abbas, cricketer
 Shahid Afridi, cricketer
 Asif Mujtaba, cricketer
 Munawwar-uz-Zaman, Olympian
Tassaduq Sohail (1930–2017), painter and short story writer
Azeem Hafeez, cricketer

References 

Universities and colleges in Karachi
Educational institutions established in 1961
1961 establishments in Pakistan